Mercedita "Mercy" Rabanes Apura is a Filipino politician from Carcar, Cebu, Philippines. She previously served as the mayor of Carcar. Apura also previously held position as barangay captain of Valladolid, Carcar and as city councilor.

References

Living people
Nacionalista Party politicians
Year of birth missing (living people)